Karsten Nielsen (born 23 May 1973 in Skælskør) is a Danish rower.

References 
 

1973 births
Living people
Danish male rowers
World Rowing Championships medalists for Denmark
People from Slagelse Municipality
Sportspeople from Region Zealand